The Wachtmeister family  is a Swedish noble family from Livonia, who immigrated to Sweden in the 16th century. The name Wachtmeister is German for 'sergeant'.

The family branched out in 1683, and was "introduced" at the Swedish House of Nobility in 1689, in a baronial and a comital main branch; Wachtmeister af Björkö no. 31 and Wachtmeister af Johannishus no. 25. The baronial branch was dissolved on the "sword side" (svärdssidan, literally "on the side of the sword" meaning without any male heirs) in Sweden on 11 July 1889, but survives in Germany, where the principal is the Prussian Count Axel-Dietrich von Wachtmeister (born 1941). A branch of the Wachtmeister af Björkö was elevated on 17 January 1816 into a Prussian, comital dignity.

History
The Swedish noble families of Wachtmeister, which originated from Hans Wachtmeister, who from Livonia came to Sweden and was ennobled in 1578. His grandson Hans became a Friherre with Björkö (in Karelia) in 1651 and is the progenitor of the baronial family of Wachtmeister af Björkö. Two of his sons became counts, namely Hans in 1687, progenitor of the comital family of Wachtmeister af Johannishus, and Axel in 1693, progenitor of the comital family of Wachtmeister af Mälsåker (in Södermanland), which dissolved on the "sword side" (svärdssidan, literally "on the side of the sword") in 1708. The aforementioned Friherre ("Baron") Hans Wachtmeister's grandson Karl Adam received count's dignity in 1799. His nephew, Friherre Karl Axel Didrik (1780–1837), who left Swedish service in 1806 with the rank of Lieutenant Colonel and settled in Pomerania, became a Prussian count in 1816.

Count Hans Wachtmeister af Johannishus' grandson's son, the Lord High Steward Carl Axel Wachtmeister, adopted, with the support of a royal letter on 5 April 1808, after his mother he took up the entailed estate of Trolleberg, the name Trolle-Wachtmeister. This name, along with the Trolle coat of arms in conjunction with that of the Wachtmeister coat of arms, must be borne by his descendant of the Wachtmeister family, who holds the mentioned entailed estate (the right of the entailed estate was transferred in 1830 from Trolleberg to Ljungby, later called Trolle-Ljungby).

Wachtmeister af Björkö no. 31

Hans Wachtmeister (1609–1652), Major General, Riksråd and Master of the Horse
Eva Juliana Wachtmeister (1639–1666), married to Count Bengt Gabrielsson Oxenstierna (1661–1666)

Wachtmeister af Johannishus no. 25

Hans Wachtmeister (1641–1714), admiral general of the Swedish Navy
Carl Hans Wachtmeister (1689–1736), Admiral
Fredrik Georg Hans Carl Wachtmeister (1720–1792), officer
Carl Axel Trolle-Wachtmeister (1754–1810), Lord of the Realm, Lord High Steward, Minister for Justice
Hans Gabriel Trolle-Wachtmeister (1782–1871), Minister for Justice
Axel Knut Trolle-Wachtmeister (1812–1907), County Governor
Hans Gustaf Trolle-Wachtmeister (1846–1922), senior valet de chambre (överstekammarjunkare)
Oskar Carl-Axel Fredrik Trolle-Wachtmeister (1893–1956), Hovjägmästare
Hans-Gabriel Trolle–Wachtmeister (born 1923), was married to Alice Viktoria Tornérhielm (1926–2017)
Hans Fredrik Wachtmeister (1752–1807), Rear Admiral
Carl Axel Wachtmeister (1795–1865), Chamberlain
Carolina Lovisa Wachtmeister (1826–1910), married to Friherre Louis Gerhard De Geer, Prime Minister of Sweden
Gerhard Louis De Geer (1854–1935), Prime Minister of Sweden
Gerard De Geer (1858–1943), geologist
Sten De Geer (1886–1933), professor
Axel Fredrik Wachtmeister (1827–1899), Chamberlain
Ulrika Charlotta Elisabet (1855-1913), married Count Magnus Gabriel de La Gardie (1839-1905)
Carl Axel Baltzar Wachtmeister (1856–1935), First Crown Equerry
Gustaf Axel Otto Wachtmeister (1887–1978), cabinet chamberlain
Wilhelm Wachtmeister (1923–2012), diplomat
Erik Wachtmeister (born 1955), Internet entrepreneur, married to Louise Wachtmeister (née Austern)
Otto Carl Fredrik Wachtmeister (1897–1938), Hovjägmästare
Brita Elisabeth (EÄ Elisabet) (Beth) Wachtmeister (1926–1972), married to Count Carl Carlsson Bonde af Björnö (1962–1972)
Gustaf Wachtmeister (1757–1826), General, Lord of the Realm
Claes Adam Wachtmeister (1795–1873), lieutenant colonel
Axel Fredrik Claesson Wachtmeister (1855–1919), Minister for Foreign Affairs
Nils Claes Ludvig Wachtmeister (1891–1960), Hovstallmästare
Gunnila Wachtmeister (1923–2016), was married to Carl Johan Bernadotte
Shering "Ted" Wachtmeister (1892–1975), jurist
Bengt Fredrik Shering Wachtmeister (1921–2006), 
Yvonne Wachtmeister (born 1951), married Prince Ludwig Ferdinand of Sayn-Wittgenstein-Berleburg (b. 1942)
Princess Anna of Bavaria (born 1978), married to Prince Manuel of Bavaria (born 1972)
Prince August Fredrik zu Sayn-Wittgenstein-Berleburg (born 1981)
Nils Erik Gustaf Wachtmeister (1923–2003), Swedish Army colonel
Thomas Axel Wilhelm "Tom" Wachtmeister (1931–2011), businessman
Ian Wachtmeister (1932–2017), industrialist and politician
Georg Carl Gustaf Wachtmeister (born 1940), 
Sten Ted Patrick Wachtmeister (born 1945), businessman
Louise Violet Gunilla Wachtmeister (1899–1992), married to Ambassador Erik Boheman (1919–1927)
Claes Adam Wachtmeister (1755–1828), Admiral
Carl Johan Wachtmeister (1793–1843), Adjutant General
Carl Wachtmeister (1823–1871), Envoy, Lord of the Realm, Minister for Foreign Affairs, married to Constance de Bourbel de Montpincon (1838–1910)
Gotthard Wachtmeister (1834–1920), County Governor
Johan Fredrik Wachtmeister (1869–1950), Swedish Army lieutenant colonel
Carl Johan Wachtmeister (1903–1993), Swedish Army colonel and fencer
Christina Hilda Wachtmeister (1796–1871), married to Lieutenant General, Baron Bror Cederström (1780–1877)

Wachtmeister af Mälsåker no. 39

Axel Wachtmeister (1643–1699), field marshal
Eleonora Margareta Wachtmeister (1684–1748), married to Count Hans Reinhold von Fersen (1683–1736)
Carl von Fersen (1716–1786), Överhovjägmästare
Axel von Fersen (1719–1794), Lord Marshal of the Riksdag of the Estates, married to Hedvig Catharina von Fersen (1732–1800)
Axel von Fersen (1755–1810), General, Marshal of the Realm of Sweden, Lord of the Realm
Sophie von Fersen (1757–1816), Lady-in-waiting
Fabian von Fersen (1762–1818), politician, officer, courtier
Hedvig "Hedda" Eleonora von Fersen (1753–1792), Lady-in-waiting

Others
Carl Wachtmeister (born 1989), footballer

References

Swedish noble families
Wachtmeister af Johannishus family